
Wadowice County is a unit of territorial administration and local government (powiat) in Lesser Poland Voivodeship, southern Poland. It came into being on January 1, 1999, as a result of the Polish local government reforms passed in 1998.

As of 2006 its total population is 154,304, out of which the population of Andrychów is 21,691, that of Wadowice is 19,149, that of Kalwaria Zebrzydowska is 4,503, and the rural population is 108,961.

Neighbouring counties
Wadowice County is bordered by Chrzanów County to the north, Kraków County and Myślenice County to the east, Sucha County to the south, Żywiec County to the south-west, Bielsko County to the west, and Oświęcim County to the north-west.

Administrative division
The county is subdivided into 10 gminas (three urban-rural and seven rural). These are listed in the following table, in descending order of population.

References
Polish official population figures 2006

 
Wadowice